Bayswater railway station is located on the Belgrave line in Victoria, Australia. It serves the eastern Melbourne suburb of Bayswater, and opened on 4 December 1889.

History

Bayswater station opened on 4 December 1889, when the line from Ringwood was extended to Upper Ferntree Gully. Like the suburb itself, the station was named after "Bayswater House", a large property owned by bookmaker and publisher James John Miller. The property itself was named after Miller's birthplace in London. During construction, the station was known as Macaulay, which was the name of a nearby post office.

In 1957, duplication of the line between Bayswater and Lower Fern Tree Gully occurred.

In 1970, boom barriers were provided at the former Mountain Highway level crossing, which was located in the up direction of the station. In 1977, the former ground-level station building was provided.

On 19 December 1982, the former ground-level island platform was provided, as part of the duplication of the line between Bayswater and Ringwood. In that same year, boom barriers were provided at the former Scoresby Road level crossing, which was located nearby in the down direction of the station.

Bayswater was once the destination for freight trains conveying cement, with the last train running on 24 June 1987, after which the traffic was relocated to Lyndhurst station, near Dandenong.

In 1998, a train maintenance centre and stabling facilities opened adjacent to the station, as part of the replacement of the Jolimont Yard. The buildings are approximately 2,850 m² in size, and permit bogie repair and replacement, and under carriage and overhead work. In 2001, Bayswater was upgraded to a Premium Station.

In November 2015, the Level Crossing Removal Authority announced plans to remove the level crossings on either side of the station, at Mountain Highway and Scoresby Road, via grade separation. In conjunction with removing the level crossings, a new Bayswater station was built below ground level. Between October and December 2016, the level crossings were removed. On 15 October of that year, the ground-level station closed, after which it was demolished to allow the new station to be built. On 12 December of that year, the station reopened to passengers.

Platforms and services
Bayswater has one island platform with two faces. It is served by Belgrave line trains.

Platform 1:
  all stations and limited express services to Flinders Street; all stations shuttle services to Ringwood

Platform 2:
  all stations services to Upper Ferntree Gully and Belgrave

Transport links
Ventura Bus Lines operates eight routes via Bayswater station, under contract to Public Transport Victoria:
 : Chirnside Park Shopping Centre – Westfield Knox
 : to Westfield Knox City
 : to Boronia station
 : to Wantirna Primary School
 : to Wantirna Primary School
 : to Glen Waverley station
 : to Westfield Knox City
  : Glen Waverley station – Croydon station (Saturday and Sunday mornings only)

Gallery

References

External links
 
 Melway map at street-directory.com.au

Premium Melbourne railway stations
Railway stations in Melbourne
Railway stations in Australia opened in 1889
Railway stations in the City of Knox